King Rollo is a children's character, created by David McKee in 1980. He is the main character in a series of books, animations narrated by Ray Brooks, and a comic strip in the magazine Buttons. Thirteen episodes of the animation were produced in 1980 by McKee's own King Rollo Films, where the character is the company's  namesake, and were originally shown as part of the pre-school 'See-Saw' strand.

Rollo himself is a childlike king who is always in need of advice and assistance from his friends. Among these are The Magician (a father figure); Cook (the king's cook, a mother figure, who was arguably the real ruler of the kingdom); his neighbour and girlfriend, Queen Gwen; King Frank; and Rollo's cat, Hamlet, who was generally portrayed as wiser than Rollo himself.

The animations used the same colourful cut-out paper look as McKee's other works, such as Mr Benn.  The 2D animation style saved on production costs. The characters' legs would rotate outwards when walking until they were at right-angles to the sides of their body.

Episodes

Books
 King Rollo and the New Shoes (1979)
 King Rollo and the Bread (1979)
 King Rollo and the Birthday (1979)
 King Rollo and the Balloons (1980)
 King Rollo and the Tree (1980)
 King Rollo and the Dishes (1980)
 King Rollo and the Bath (1981)
 King Rollo and King Frank (1981)
 King Rollo and the Search (1981)
 King Rollo and the Playroom (1982)
 King Rollo and the Breakfast (1982)
 King Rollo and the Dog (1982)
 King Rollo and the Mask (1982)
 King Rollo's Letter and Other Stories (1984): collection containing: King Rollo and the Letter; King Rollo and the Bush; King Rollo and the Present; King Rollo and the Tent
 King Rollo's Winter (1986): board book
 King Rollo's Spring (1987): board book
 King Rollo's Summer (1988): board book
 King Rollo's Autumn (1988): board book
 King Rollo and Santa's Beard (1990): also published as King Rollo's Christmas
 King Rollo and the New Stockings (2001)

Collections
 The Adventures of King Rollo (1982): King Rollo and the New Shoes; King Rollo and the Birthday; King Rollo and the Bread; King Rollo and the Tree
 The Further Adventures of King Rollo (1983): King Rollo and the Dishes; King Rollo and the Balloons; King Rollo and King Frank; King Rollo and the Search
 King Rollo's Playroom and Other Stories (1984): King Rollo and the Playroom; King Rollo and the Breakfast; King Rollo and the Dog; King Rollo and the Mask
 The Adventures of King Rollo (2016): collection of separate hardback books containing: King Rollo and the New Shoes; King Rollo and the Bread; King Rollo and the Birthday; King Rollo and King Frank

References

External links

Toonhound

1980s British children's television series
1980 British television series debuts
1980 British television series endings
British children's animated adventure television series
King Rollo
Characters in British novels of the 20th century
King Rollo
King Rollo
Rollo, King
King Rollo
Television shows based on children's books
English-language television shows
1980s British animated television series